Medhurst is a surname, and may refer to:

 Charles Medhurst (1896–1954), Royal Air Force officer
 Cameron Medhurst (born 1965), Australian figure skater
 George Medhurst (1759–1827), mechanical engineer and inventor
 Harry Medhurst (1916–1984), British footballer
 Matthew Medhurst (born 1983), British Dart player 
 Natalie Medhurst (born 1984), Australian netball player
 Paul Medhurst (born 1981), Australian rules footballer
 Paul Medhurst (cyclist) (1953–2009), New Zealand track cyclist 
 R. Medhurst (Sussex cricketer), Reginald Frank Medhurst a.k.a. Robert Henry Medhurst (dates uncertain), English cricketer active from 1948 to 1951 
 Walter Henry Medhurst (1796–1857), English Congregationalist missionary to China
 Sir Walter Henry Medhurst (1822–1885), British diplomat

See also
 Edward Ivo Medhurst Barrett (1879-1950), English cricketer and rugby player